John L. Sloane (March 28, 1847 – January 12, 1897) was an express agent, clerk of district court, chief clerk of the U.S. Land Office, deputy clerk assessor, lawyer, and the 7th mayor of Missoula, Montana.  He was born in New York City, New York, and in 1864 he enlisted in the Fifth New York Veteran Volunteers, Duryea Zouaves, and served in the Civil War until its completion.  He would later serve as a second lieutenant in the Second California Volunteer Cavalry before moving to Fort Missoula soon after the fort was opened in 1877.  He left the army in 1881 and in 1883 was elected the first police magistrate of Missoula, Montana.  He served in this capacity until May 6, 1889, when he was elected both clerk of the district court and the seventh mayor of Missoula.  After holding multiple elected positions, he retired from active work in 1901.  He died at his daughter's home in Seattle, Washington, in 1914, and was buried in Missoula Cemetery.

References

Politicians from New York City
People of New York (state) in the American Civil War
History of Missoula, Montana
Mayors of Missoula, Montana
1847 births
1914 deaths
19th-century American politicians